Kate Lipper-Garabedian is an American politician. She is a Democrat representing the 32nd Middlesex district in the Massachusetts House of Representatives. She was previously a City Councillor in Melrose, Massachusetts.

Biography

Lipper-Garabedian holds a BA in English and History from the University of Virginia, and a JD from Harvard Law School. She was a seventh-grade teacher with Teach for America from 2003 to 2005 before becoming an attorney.

Political career
Lipper-Garabedian served on the Melrose, MA City Council, representing the at-large district, from 2018 to 2020.

In 2020, Lipper-Garabedian won a special election to represent the 32nd Middlesex district in the Massachusetts House of Representatives, after former Representative Paul A. Brodeur was elected Mayor of Melrose. She won the primary against two opponents, with 68.1% of the vote, and won the general election with 81.5% of the vote. She was sworn in on March 25; due to the COVID-19 pandemic, the ceremony took place at the foot of the Grand Staircase in the State House, rather than during a formal House session (as would typically happen).

She has been endorsed by the Massachusetts Women's Political Caucus.

Electoral record

See also
 2019–2020 Massachusetts legislature
 2021–2022 Massachusetts legislature

References

Democratic Party members of the Massachusetts House of Representatives
Women state legislators in Massachusetts
University of Virginia alumni
Harvard Law School alumni
Living people
Year of birth missing (living people)
21st-century American politicians
21st-century American women politicians
Teach For America alumni